Langerak is a town in the Dutch province of South Holland. It is a part of the municipality of Molenlanden.

The village of "Langerak" has a population of around 1730.
The statistical area "Langerak", which also can include the surrounding countryside, has a population of around 1730.

Langerak was a separate municipality between 1817 and 1986, when it became part of Liesveld. Since 2013 Liesveld has become part of the new municipality of Molenwaard.

References

Former municipalities of South Holland
Populated places in South Holland
Molenlanden